Uncle Tony's Coloring Book is the third solo studio album by American hip hop producer Blockhead. It was released on August 14, 2007. The vinyl edition of the album was later released on Young Heavy Souls.

Critical reception

Noel Dix of Exclaim! wrote, "The New York producer mashes together a lot of rock licks, Bollywood breaks and children's records to make a diverse offering that keeps you paying attention and, more importantly, is fun to listen to." Scott Thill of XLR8R commented that "his ear for rump-shaking anthems is as tight as ever, which is why rappers are clamoring more to work with him."

Track listing

Personnel
Credits adapted from the CD liner notes.

 Blockhead – production, arrangement
 Damien Paris – co-production (3), guitar (4, 8, 12, 13), bass guitar (1, 12), electronics (2), synthesizer (7, 10)
 DJ Signify – turntables (1, 4, 6, 12)
 Andrew Totolos – additional drums (2, 7, 8)
 Owen Brozman – artwork
 Bisc1 – layout

References

External links
 

2007 albums
Blockhead (music producer) albums